Basaveshwara Engineering College (Autonomous) (also known as BEC) is a private co-educational engineering college in Bagalkot, Karnataka, India.

References

Engineering colleges in Karnataka
Educational institutions established in 1963
1963 establishments in Mysore State